James Algernon Palmer-Tomkinson (born James Algernon Tomkinson; 3 April 1915 – 7 January 1952) was a British alpine ski racer who competed in the Winter Olympics in 1936 and 1948. He also competed and won in the Oxford-Cambridge ski race for Oxford, winning in 1935. He was educated at Eton College.

He was the son of James Palmer-Tomkinson, the grandson of James Tomkinson and the father of Charles Palmer-Tomkinson and Jeremy Palmer-Tomkinson, also Winter Olympians. He was a third cousin of Queen Elizabeth II.

At the 1936 Winter Olympics, he finished 14th in the combined, the sole alpine event, at Garmisch, Germany.

Palmer-Tomkinson died at age 36 after a skiing accident in Switzerland.

See also
List of skiing deaths

References

1915 births
1952 deaths
People educated at Eton College
British male alpine skiers
Olympic alpine skiers of Great Britain
Alpine skiers at the 1936 Winter Olympics
Alpine skiers at the 1948 Winter Olympics
Skiing deaths
James
Sport deaths in Switzerland